Hans-Heinrich Sander (born 12 April 1945 in Golmbach, died 22 April 2017) was a German politician for the Free Democratic Party (German: Freie Demokratische Partei/FDP).

He was elected to the Lower Saxon Landtag in 2003, and has been re-elected on one occasion. He has served as the Lower-Saxon Minister of Environment in the first cabinet Wulff and served as the Lower-Saxon Minister of Environment and Climate Protection in the second cabinet Wulff/McAllister.

Family and personal life 
Hans-Heinrich Sander was the son of former agriculturist and politician Heinrich Sander. He began his joblife as agriculturist but went on studying teaching after suffering a heavy work accident in which he lost his left arm.  After receiving a teaching degree by the PH Göttingen in 1973 he became a teacher and later the headmaster of the elementary school in Bevern where he stayed until 2002. Also, he was an agriculturist like his father. Sander was married and had two children. He was still running a fruit company in his hometown Golmbach.

Sander was married and had two children. His daughter is also involved in German local politics in Berlin.

Sander died on 22 April 2017, aged 72.

Party 
Sander became a member of the Free Democratic Party in 1968. He was deputy chairman of the Lower-Saxon Free Democratic Party and district chairman of the Free Democratic Party Holzminden. He has been the mayor of the Samtgemeinde Bevern from 2001 to 2003.

Politics 
In 1973 he became a member of the county council of Holzminden which he stayed until 2006. He was a member of the Lower-Saxon parliament since 2003 and the Lower-Saxon Minister of Environment and Climate Protection since March 4, 2003. Since 1996, Hans-Heinrich Sander was Deputy District Administrator of Holzminden.

He describes himself as a practitioner who wants to give the people some free space in the field of environmental politics. In his opinion ambitious environmental politics will fail if it does not pick up the people along with it.

References 

Free Democratic Party (Germany) politicians
Members of the Landtag of Lower Saxony
Ministers of the Lower Saxony State Government
1945 births
2017 deaths